Crows Nest, Crow's Nest or Crowsnest may refer to:

 Crow's nest, a structure in the upper part of the main mast of a ship, or a structure that is used as a lookout point

Places
 Crows Nest, New South Wales, Australia
Crows Nest railway station
 Crows Nest, Queensland, Australia
 Crows Nest National Park
 Shire of Crows Nest
 Electoral district of Crows Nest
 Crow's Nest, Nova Scotia, Canada
 Crowsnest Highway, in British Columbia and Alberta, Canada
 Crowsnest Pass, a mountain pass on the Alberta–British Columbia border, Canada
 Crowsnest Mountain
 Crowsnest Provincial Park
 Crowsnest River, Alberta, Canada
 Crow's Nest (Hong Kong), a hill 
 Crow's Nest, Cornwall, England, United Kingdom
 Crows Nest, Indiana, U.S.
 Crow's Nest, Montana, U.S. near the Battle of the Little Bighorn in 1876
 Crow's Nest (New York), U.S. a mountain 
 Crows Nest (Wilmington, Vermont), U.S., a historic property
 Crow's Nest Natural Area Preserve, in Stafford County, Virginia, U.S.
 Crows Nest Point, a cape in Virginia

Other uses
 The Crow's Nest (University of South Florida St. Petersburg), a student newspaper
 Crowsnest, an airborne early warning pod for the Merlin helicopter

See also